Spilarctia mona is a moth in the family Erebidae. It was described by Charles Swinhoe in 1885. It is found in southern India.

References

M
Endemic fauna of India
Moths of Asia
Moths described in 1885